Brad Madison Hoylman-Sigal (born October 27, 1965) is an American Democratic politician. First elected in 2012, Hoylman represents the 47th District in the New York State Senate, covering much of Lower and Midtown Manhattan in New York City. He is chairman of the state senate Judiciary Committee.

Early life
Hoylman was born in West Virginia, where he grew up in rural Lewisburg. He was the youngest of six children of Audrey Kennedy Hoylman, a public elementary school teacher, and James M. Hoylman, a process systems analytics analyst. He is a former Eagle Scout in Troop 70, Lewisburg, West Virginia. He attended Greenbrier East High School in West Virginia.

He attended West Virginia University (WVU; BA in political science and English literature, 1989), where Hoylman was elected president of student administration and graduated summa cum laude with honors. At WVU he was a member of Phi Beta Kappa, and received a Truman Scholarship and a Marshall Scholarship.

Hoylman then attended Oxford University (Exeter College) on a Rhodes Scholarship. He received a master's degree in political science (M.Phil., 1992).

Afterward, he attended Harvard Law School. He graduated with a JD in 1996.

Early career
Hoylman was an associate at law firm Paul, Weiss, Rifkind, Wharton & Garrison from 1996–98. He was an associate at Frankfurt, Garbus, Klein & Selz from 1998–2000.

From 2000–12, Hoylman served as executive vice president and general counsel of the Partnership for New York City, which represents New York City's business leadership and its largest private-sector employers.

Hoylman was also the chairperson of Community Board 2 in Manhattan, and the Democratic District Leader of the New York 66th Assembly District, Part A.  He is also Trustee of the Community Service Society of New York, a former president of the Gay and Lesbian Independent Democrats, and a former board member of the Empire State Pride Agenda, Tenants & Neighbors, Class Size Matters, and Citizen Action.

In 2001, Hoylman ran for the New York City Council in the first district, which includes Governor's Island and a portion of Lower Manhattan. He placed second in a seven-candidate race, losing to Alan Gerson.

New York Senate

2012–19

On June 11, 2012, Hoylman declared his candidacy for the 27th District of the New York State Senate, running for the seat of retiring State Senator Tom Duane. He won Duane's endorsement, as well as the support of numerous local politicians and unions. In the Democratic primary election held on September 13, 2012, he won 68% of the vote in a three-candidate field. Hell's Kitchen activist and bar owner Tom Greco was his closest competition, winning 24% of the vote. In the general election in November he was unopposed.

Hoylman won the Democratic primary and general election (with 80% of the vote) in 2014, 2016 (with 96% of the vote), and 2018 (with 99% of the vote). As of 2019, Hoylman was the only openly gay member of the New York State Senate.

In December 2016, Hoylman sponsored legislation known as the Tax Returns Uniformly Made Public (T.R.U.M.P.) Act, prohibiting New York State electors from voting for a presidential candidate who has not publicly released at least 5 years worth of tax returns no later than 50 days prior to a general election. Lawmakers in 25 other states followed suit in producing legislation to compel presidential candidates to release their tax returns. A Change.org online petition in support of Hoylman's bill received nearly 150,000 signatures as of May 2017, and the idea was praised by the editorial board of The New York Times.

After the 2018 midterm elections, Hoylman was appointed Chair of the Senate Judiciary Committee. In the majority, Hoylman passed multiple pieces of legislation including the Child Victims Act, the Gender Expression Non-Discrimination Act (or GENDA), and a ban on so-called 'gay conversion therapy.'  Hoylman also passed the TRUST Act, which would allow certain Congressional committees to perform oversight by reviewing the New York State tax returns of senior government officials; members of Congress suggested this could allow Congressional committees to review Donald Trump's tax returns. City & State, a New York-based political news organization, characterized Hoylman as "the person behind state Senate’s progressive bills."

In 2019, the Child Victims Act that Hoylman sponsored was adopted. It extended New York's statutes of limitations for child sexual abuse and created a one-year lookback window within which survivors would be able to initiate claims against their abusers in cases where the statute of limitations had expired, and allowed them to bring a civil lawsuit against their abuser or institutions that enabled or protected their abuser by the age of 55 (up from the age of 23). Over 9,000 lawsuits have been filed under that law, including against the Catholic Church, the Boy Scouts, and other groups that cared for children.

2020–present
In early 2021, Governor Andrew Cuomo signed Brad Hoylman's bill to repeal the ban on paid gestational surrogacy. Assemblywoman Amy Paulin introduced the bill in 2012.  As of the bill's passage, only two states (Louisiana and Michigan) remained with laws explicitly banning paid surrogacy.

In June 2021, Hoylman lost his bid to be elected the Democratic candidate for Manhattan Borough President. Mark Levine defeated him, by 7.4%.

That same month, the New York Senate passed the Adult Survivors Act sponsored by Hoylman and Assembly Member Linda Rosenthal. The act would create a one-year window for the revival of time-barred civil lawsuits based on sex crimes committed against individuals who were 18 years of age or older.

On September 24, 2021, Hoylman wrote a letter to US Senator Maria Cantwell, requesting that the US Senate Committee on Commerce, Science, and Transportation engage in oversight of the United States Center for SafeSport, and step in to ensure that SafeSport is adequately conducting investigations. He referred to what he called SafeSport's failure to carry out impartial and thorough investigations and ensure the safety of athletes it is charged with protecting. He highlighted the fact that despite serious outstanding allegations of sexual misconduct, sexual coercion, and other violent behaviors by former friends, peers, and current teammates, and an ongoing investigation, fencer Alen Hadzic was allowed to travel to Tokyo as an alternate for the 2021 US Olympic fencing team.

In October 2021, City & State ranked Hoylman #11 on its annual list of the 100 most powerful people in Manhattan.

In December 2021, Hoylman proposed legislation to remove a number of zoning regulations in New York that he viewed as onerous. The legislation would eliminate parking requirements and prohibit localities from requiring large lot sizes for homes. It would also allow for the construction of up to four housing units on lots that were previously exclusively zoned for single-family housing.

Personal life
Brad Madison Hoylman married David Ivan Sigal, a filmmaker, at Congregation Beit Simchat Torah in Manhattan, New York City, in February 2013. They live with their two daughters, Silvia and Lucy, in Greenwich Village. Hoylman is Jewish.

See also
 LGBT culture in New York City
 LGBT rights in New York
 List of LGBT people from New York City

References

External links
Campaign website

Living people
1965 births
Alumni of Exeter College, Oxford
American lawyers
American Rhodes Scholars
Candidates in the 2021 United States elections
Gay politicians
Harvard Law School alumni
Jewish American state legislators in New York (state)
LGBT Jews
LGBT lawyers
LGBT people from West Virginia
LGBT state legislators in New York (state)
Paul, Weiss, Rifkind, Wharton & Garrison people
People from Lewisburg, West Virginia
Politicians from New York City
Democratic Party New York (state) state senators
West Virginia University alumni
21st-century American politicians
Lawyers from New York City
Politicians from Manhattan
21st-century American Jews
20th-century American lawyers
21st-century American lawyers
21st-century LGBT people